Pandanus conglomeratus is a species of plant in the family Pandanaceae, endemic to Mauritius, but possibly extinct.

Description
A short (4-5m), sparsely-branched tree. The sharp, pale green leaves are armed with large, white, erect spines.

This species can be distinguished by its oblong fruit-heads, several of which appear together on a pendulous peduncle. It is the only species of Mauritius to have more than one fruit-head on the same stalk.

Distribution
It was endemic to Mauritius, where it was formerly common in the damper parts of the highlands. It was recently recorded from near Midlands (Riviere Eau Bleue), Fressanges and Beau-Bassin. However it now appears to be extinct.

References

conglomeratus
Endemic flora of Mauritius
Extinct plants
Taxa named by Isaac Bayley Balfour